Veliki Osolnik is a village west of Rašica in the Municipality of Velike Lašče in central Slovenia. The entire municipality is part of the traditional region of Lower Carniola and is now included in the Central Slovenia Statistical Region.

Church

The local church, built on a hill east of the village, is dedicated to Saint Lawrence and belongs to the Parish of Rob. Originally a medieval church, it was thoroughly rebuilt in the 18th century.

References

External links
Veliki Osolnik on Geopedia

Populated places in the Municipality of Velike Lašče